The Crimson Dove is a 1917 American silent drama film directed by Romaine Fielding and starring Carlyle Blackwell, June Elvidge and Marie La Varre.

Cast 
 Carlyle Blackwell as Brand Cameron 
 June Elvidge as Adrienne Durant 
 Marie La Varre as Faro Kate 
 Henry West as Jim Carewe 
 Edward Hoyt as Jonathan Gregg 
 Dion Titheradge as Philip Burbank 
 Maxine Elliott Hicks as Minnie Zugg 
 Louis R. Grisel as Joseph Burbank 
 Norman Hackett as Half-witted Son 
 George Cowl as Dr. Stewart 
 Charles Hartley as Cameron's Old Servant 
 Mildred Beckwith as Nevada 
 Julia Stuart as Widow Oatmeal 
 George S. Trimble as Durant 
 Blanche Davenport as Mrs. Lundy 
 Charles Sadlek as Dan Pollard

References

Bibliography
 Cari Beauchamp. Without Lying Down: Frances Marion and the Powerful Women of Early Hollywood. University of California Press, 1998.

External links
 

1917 films
1917 drama films
1910s English-language films
American silent feature films
Silent American drama films
Films directed by Romaine Fielding
American black-and-white films
World Film Company films
1910s American films